Metamora is an unincorporated town and census-designated place in Metamora Township, Franklin County, Indiana. The town was once a stop along the Whitewater Canal and is now primarily dependent on tourism. As of the 2010 census, it had a population of 188.

Geography

Demographics

History
Metamora was platted in 1838.  The community derives its name from the play Metamora; or, The Last of the Wampanoags by John Augustus Stone.

The Whitewater Canal only carried boats from 1839 to 1865, but the canal was maintained to supply hydraulic power until 1936. The canal was the center of industrial districts in Metamora and Brookville,  to the east.  At one time there were water-powered mills for processing cotton, grinding flour and making paper. Metamora is the location of Indiana's oldest and still operating water-powered grist mill.  The state of Indiana provides canal boat rides pulled by horses, through the only existing wooden aqueduct in the United States (the Duck Creek Aqueduct), with a historical review of the canal history which fueled the southeastern Indiana economy until its displacement by the railroad.  The canal is named after the nearby Whitewater River.

The Metamora Historic District and Whitewater Canal Historic District are listed on the National Register of Historic Places.

Notable person
Tom Alley, Indy car driver

References

External links
Metamora 1838 Canal Town

Census-designated places in Franklin County, Indiana
Census-designated places in Indiana